= Jesse P. Fuller =

American politician

Member of the Maine House of Representatives
- In office 1951–1958

Personal details
- Born: September 29, 1901
- Died: January 19, 1962 (aged 60)
- Party: Republican

Jesse P. Fuller (September 29, 1901 - January 19, 1962) was an American politician from Maine. Fuller, a Republican from South Portland, served in the Maine House of Representatives from 1951 to 1958. From 1953 to 1954, Fuller was House Majority Leader.
